The 1848 Rhode Island gubernatorial election was held on April 5, 1848.

Incumbent Whig Governor Elisha Harris won re-election to a second term, defeating Democratic nominee Adnah Sackett.

General election

Candidates
Adnah Sackett, Democratic, manufacturer of jewelry. Sackett was nominated after Olney Ballou declined the nomination.
Elisha Harris, Whig, incumbent Governor

Results

Notes

References

1848
Rhode Island
Gubernatorial